Persatuan Sepakbola Hatusela Mamala (simply known as PS Hatusela Mamala) is an Indonesian football club based in Central Maluku Regency, Maluku. They currently competes in Liga 3.

Honours 
 Liga 3 Maluku
 Winners (1): 2019

References

Football clubs in Indonesia
Football clubs in Maluku (province)
Association football clubs established in 1980
1980 establishments in Indonesia